Bangkok Love Stories: Plead is a 2019 segment of the Thai-language television anthology series Bangkok Love Stories, created by Ekachai Uekrongtham and starring Morakot Liu, Chanon Santinatornkul and Sutatta Udomsilp. The plot is set in Chinatown and revolves around Liu (Surapol Poonpiriya) who grinds almonds as his day job, and a fortune teller at nights. Liu's son Tee (Chanon Santinatornkul) is going blind.

The first episode was released on February 13, 2019 and the last on May 8, 2019 on GMM 25.

Cast
 Surapol Poonpiriya as Liu
 Chanon Santinatornkul as Tee
 Cholsawas Tiewwanichkul as Ong
 Sutatta Udomsilp as Elle
 Morakot Liu as Pai

Release
Bangkok Love Stories: Plead was released between February 13, 2019 and May 8, 2019 on GMM 25.

References

External links
 

2010s Thai television series
2010s drama television series
Thai drama television series
2019 Thai television series debuts
Thai-language television shows
Bangkok Love Stories